The Good Doctor or Good Doctor may refer to:

Arts and media

Film
 The Good Doctor (1939 film), directed by Mario Soffici.
 The Good Doctor (2011 film), an American thriller directed by Lance Daly.

Television
 Good Doctor (advertisement), a promotion for Stella Artois
 Good Doctor (South Korean TV series), a 2013 medical drama
 The Good Doctor (American TV series), a 2017 medical drama, based on the 2013 South Korean series
 Good Doctor (Japanese TV series), a 2018 medical drama, based on the 2013 South Korean series
 "The Good Doctor" (Law & Order: Criminal Intent), the ninth episode of the first season of the American police procedural television series 
 "The Good Doctor", the eleventh episode of the 2005 series Close to Home

Books
 The Good Doctors, a 2009 non-fiction book by historian John Dittmer
 The Good Doctor (novel), a novel by Damon Galgut

Other uses in media
 The Good Doctor (play), by Neil Simon
 "The Good Doctor", a song by The Protomen from Act II: The Father of Death
 “Good Doctor”, a song by Robbie Williams from Rudebox 
 The Doctor (Doctor Who), a character from a British science fiction television program frequently referred to as "my Good Doctor”

People
 Isaac Asimov (born 1920-1994), Russian-American author
 Kenny Deuchar (born 1980), Scottish footballer
Harold Shipman (born 1946-2004), English doctor and prolific serial killer